John Ludwig Welaj (May 27, 1914 – September 13, 2003) was an American professional baseball outfielder and executive.

Playing career
In 200 games played for Washington (1939–) and 93 for Philadelphia (1943), Welaj collected 198 hits, with 40 doubles, three triples, four home runs and 74 runs batted in. He batted .250 lifetime in 793 at bats.

Welaj also had an extensive minor league career, spanning 21 seasons from 1936 to 1956. In 1955, he served as manager of the Hagerstown Packets in the Senators' organization. He was a player-manager of the Erie Senators in 1956, then returned to full-time managing with the Midland/Lamesa Indians in 1957.

Executive career
After 1957, Welaj served in the front offices of both 20th century American League Washington franchises. He worked in sales and promotions for the 1901–1960 Senators, until they left the U.S. capital to become the Minnesota Twins. Welaj then performed similar duties for the expansion Senators of 1961–1971. From 1973 until 1984, he served as the Rangers' director of stadium operations, after which he retired as a full-time employee at age 70. However, he continued to serve as the Rangers' spring training director until 1999. 

Welaj died in 2003 at the age of 89 in Arlington, Texas.

References

Sources

1914 births
2003 deaths
Albany Senators players
American people of Polish descent
Baseball players from Pennsylvania
Buffalo Bisons (minor league) players
Erie Senators players
Havana Sugar Kings players
Kansas City Blues (baseball) players
Louisville Colonels (minor league) players
Major League Baseball outfielders
Minor league baseball managers
Montreal Royals players
People from Cambria County, Pennsylvania
Philadelphia Athletics players
Springfield Nationals players
Syracuse Chiefs players
Texas Rangers executives
Toronto Maple Leafs (International League) players
Trenton Senators players
Washington Senators (1901–1960) executives
Washington Senators (1901–1960) players
Washington Senators (1961–1971) executives
York White Roses players
American expatriate baseball players in Cuba